Hardiya may refer to:

Hardiya, Narayani, Nepal
Hardiya, Sagarmatha, Nepal
Hardiya, Jagdishpur, India
Hardiya, Tarari, India